Rigdum Funnidus may refer to:
 Rigdum Funnidus, a collective pen-name of Horace Mayhew, Henry Mayhew and Robert Brough, nineteenth century editors of George Cruikshank's The Comic Almanack
 Rigdum Funnidus, a race horse, fl. 1796